Events from the year 1513 in Ireland.

Incumbent
Lord: Henry VIII

Events
c. September – Gerald FitzGerald, 9th Earl of Kildare becomes Earl, Lord Lieutenant of Ireland, and Lord Justice following the death of his father Gearóid Mór FitzGerald, 8th Earl of Kildare. 
Late – Irish chiefs ravage part of The Pale.
William Rokeby, Primate of Ireland appointed Lord Chancellor of Ireland.

Births
Thomas FitzGerald, 10th Earl of Kildare (d. 1537)

Deaths
c. September – Gearóid Mór FitzGerald, 8th Earl of Kildare, peer and Lord Lieutenant of Ireland.

References

 
1510s in Ireland
Ireland
Years of the 16th century in Ireland